Composer Howard Shore has received many awards and nominations over the course of his career. These include three Academy Awards, three Golden Globe Awards and four Grammy Awards.

Major Associations

Academy Awards
The Academy Awards are a set of awards given annually for excellence of cinematic achievements. The awards, organized by the Academy of Motion Picture Arts and Sciences, were first held in 1929 at the Hollywood Roosevelt Hotel. Shore has received three awards from four nominations.

{| class="wikitable
|-
! scope="col" style="width:1em;"| Year
! scope="col" style="width:35em;"| Nominated work
! scope="col" style="width:40em;"| Category
! scope="col" style="width:5em;"| Result
! scope="col" style="width:1em;"| Ref
|-
| 2002
| The Lord of the Rings: The Fellowship of the Ring
| rowspan=2 | Best Original Score
| 
| rowspan=4| 
|-
| rowspan=2 | 2004
| rowspan=2 | The Lord of the Rings: The Return of the King
| 
|-
| Best Original Song
| 
|-
| 2012
| Hugo
| rowspan=2 | Best Original Score
| 
|-
|-style="border-top:2px solid gray;"

BAFTA Film Awards
The BAFTA Award is an annual award show presented by the British Academy of Film and Television Arts. The awards were founded in 1947 as The British Film Academy, by David Lean, Alexander Korda, Carol Reed, Charles Laughton, Roger Manvell and others. Shore has received six nominations.
{| class="wikitable
|-
! scope="col" style="width:1em;"| Year
! scope="col" style="width:35em;"| Nominated work
! scope="col" style="width:40em;"| Category
! scope="col" style="width:5em;"| Result
! scope="col" style="width:1em;"| Ref
|-
| 1992
| The Silence of the Lambs
| rowspan=6 | Best Film Music
| 
| rowspan=6 | 
|-
| 2002
| The Lord of the Rings: The Fellowship of the Ring
| 
|-
| 2003
| Gangs of New York
| 
|-
| 2004
| The Lord of the Rings: The Return of the King
| 
|-
| 2005
| The Aviator
| 
|-
| 2012
| Hugo
| 
|-

Golden Globe Awards
The Golden Globe Award is an accolade bestowed by the 93 members of the Hollywood Foreign Press Association (HFPA) recognizing excellence in film and television, both domestic and foreign. Shore has received three awards from six nominations.

{| class="wikitable
|-
! scope="col" style="width:1em;"| Year
! scope="col" style="width:35em;"| Nominated work
! scope="col" style="width:40em;"| Category
! scope="col" style="width:5em;"| Result
! scope="col" style="width:1em;"| Ref
|-
| 2002
| The Lord of the Rings: The Fellowship of the Ring
| rowspan=2 |Best Original Score
| 
| rowspan=6 | 
|-
| rowspan=2 | 2004
| rowspan=2 | The Lord of the Rings: The Return of the King
| 
|-
| Best Original Song
| 
|-
| 2005
| The Aviator
| rowspan=3 |Best Original Score
| 
|-
| 2008
| Eastern Promises
| 
|-
| 2012
| Hugo
|

Grammy Awards
The Grammy Awards are presented by The Recording Academy to recognize achievements in the music industry. Shore has received eight nominations and won four awards.

{| class="wikitable
|-
! scope="col" style="width:1em;"| Year
! scope="col" style="width:35em;"| Nominated work
! scope="col" style="width:40em;"| Category
! scope="col" style="width:5em;"| Result
! scope="col" style="width:1em;"| Ref
|-
| 1995
| Best Instrumental Composition
| Ed Wood
| 
| rowspan=8 | 
|-
| 2002
| rowspan=3 |Best Score Soundtrack for Visual Media
| The Lord of the Rings: The Fellowship of the Ring
| 
|-
| 2003
| The Lord of the Rings: The Two Towers
| 
|-
| rowspan=2 |2004
| rowspan=2 |The Lord of the Rings: The Return of the King
| 
|-
| Best Song for Visual Media
| 
|-
| 2005
| rowspan=3 |Best Score Soundtrack for Visual Media
| The Aviator
| 
|-
|2007
| The Departed
| 
|-
|2012
| Hugo
|

References 

Shore, Howard